Park Jin-seop (born 23 October 1995) is a South Korean footballer who plays as midfielder for Jeonbuk Hyundai Motors.

Career
Lee joined K League 2 side Ansan Greeners before 2018 season starts.

In 2020, he joined Daejeon Hana Citizen.

After 2021 season, he joined Jeonbuk Hyundai Motors.

Honours
Individual
K League 2 Best XI: 2021
K League 1 Best XI: 2022

References

External links

1995 births
Living people
Association football midfielders
South Korean footballers
Daejeon Korail FC players
Ansan Greeners FC players
Daejeon Hana Citizen FC players
Jeonbuk Hyundai Motors players
Korea National League players
K League 1 players
K League 2 players